Area code 253 is a telephone area code in the North American Numbering Plan (NANP) for a part of the U.S. state of Washington. The numbering plan area (NPA) includes the area south of Seattle and the southern Puget Sound area, centered at Tacoma and extending to include the areas around Gig Harbor, Auburn, and Roy. It also serves the western half of Pierce County, as well as southern King County.

The area code commenced service on April 27, 1997, as part of a three-way split of area code 206. The other of the three is area code 425. In the lead-up to the switchover, John Keister, on his television comedy show Almost Live!, lampooned the fact that Renton wanted to join the 425 area code to be associated with the relatively wealthy  Eastside, which includes Bellevue.

Area code 253 participates in the complex overlay plan of area code 564, which also encompasses area codes 206, 360, and 425.

Service area

Auburn
Bonney Lake
Burley
Covington
DuPont
Federal Way
Fife
Joint Base Lewis-McChord
Fox Island
Gig Harbor
Graham
Kent
Lakewood
Lake Tapps
Milton
Parkland
Puyallup
Roy
Sumner
Spanaway
Steilacoom
Tacoma
University Place

See also
List of Washington (state) area codes
List of NANP area codes

References

External links
NANPA Washington area code map 
Interactive map of area code 253

253
253
Telecommunications-related introductions in 1997